"Have You Ever" is a song by British pop group S Club 7, released as a single on 19 November 2001. Following the success of the group's 2000 Children in Need track, "Never Had a Dream Come True", the BBC asked S Club 7 to perform the 2001 track for the charity as well. "Have You Ever" was co-written by Cathy Dennis, Andrew Frampton, and Chris Braide. "Have You Ever" acted as an introduction to S Club 7's third album, Sunshine (2001).

The single entered the UK Singles Chart at number one on 25 November 2001. The Children in Need version of "Have You Ever" is listed in the Guinness Book of World Records as having the highest number of people's voices recorded in a single song; as recordings from children in schools across the UK were used in the chorus. The song has sold 380,000 copies in the UK according to the Official UK Charts Company. The photo for the cover of the single was shot in another major architectural landmark of the Los Angeles area - the Sheats Goldstein Residence near Beverly Hills.

Music video
The music video was set inside a large house (which is actually the famous Ennis House in Hollywood Hills), showing each member briefly as they indulge in everyday activities, while O'Meara is the main focus of the video. O'Meara revealed that to film the shot of her crying, they used droplets of water on her cheek, and sped the track up to film it, so when it was mastered it would give the illusion of a real tear. Another interesting note about the video is that it was the last video Paul Cattermole shot for the group as "You", the following single, was intended to be the next release and thus had been recorded previously. The video was shot at the last minute, the day before the band returned to the UK after filming Hollywood 7 as the song was chosen for the Children in Need song.

Children in Need performance
During the performance on Children in Need on 16 November 2001, the group were joined by S Club Juniors which was their first television appearance.

Track listings

 UK CD single
 "Have You Ever" – 3:20
 "Have You Ever" (BBC Children in Need version) – 3:20
 "Dangerous" – 3:52
 "Have You Ever" (CD-ROM video)

 UK cassette single
 "Have You Ever" – 3:20
 "Have You Ever" (BBC Children in Need version) – 3:20

 European CD single
 "Have You Ever" – 3:20
 "Never Had a Dream Come True" – 4:00

 Australian CD single
 "Have You Ever" – 3:20
 "Never Had a Dream Come True" – 4:00
 "Dangerous" – 3:52
 "Have You Ever" (CD-ROM video)

Credits and personnel
Credits are lifted from the Sunshine album booklet.

Studios
 Vocals recorded at Larrabee Studios (Los Angeles)
 Produced and mixed at The Aquarium (London, England)
 Mastered at Transfermation (London, England)

Personnel

 Cathy Dennis – writing, arrangement
 Andrew Frampton – writing, programming
 Chris Braide – writing
 John Themis – guitars
 Greg Wells – piano, organ
 Dave Stewart – keyboards
 Stephen Lipson – programming, production
 Heff Moraes – mixing, engineering
 Richard Dowling – mastering

Charts and certifications

Weekly charts

Year-end charts

Certifications

Release history

References

S Club 7 songs
19 Recordings singles
2001 singles
2001 songs
Children in Need singles
Music videos directed by Julien Temple
Number-one singles in Scotland
Polydor Records singles
Song recordings produced by Stephen Lipson
Songs written by Andrew Frampton (songwriter)
Songs written by Cathy Dennis
Songs written by Chris Braide
UK Singles Chart number-one singles